The waltz "Sobre las olas" ("Over the Waves") is the best-known work of Mexican composer Juventino Rosas (1868–1894). It "remains one of the most famous Latin American pieces worldwide", according to the "Latin America" article in The Oxford Companion to Music.

It was first published by Rosas in 1888. It remains popular as a classic waltz, and has also found its way into New Orleans Jazz and Tejano music.

Recordings
 Dave Brubeck on Bravo! Brubeck! (1967)
 Chet Atkins, on Alone (1973)
 The Beach Boys, on Feel Flows (2021) (recorded in 1970 as “Carnival”)
 Willie Nelson, on Red Headed Stranger (1975)
 Pete Fountain, on Mr. New Orleans

In popular media
Snippets of the melody were used in Warner Bros. cartoons, including in the 1943 An Itch in Time and 1950 Canary Row.

A Mexican biographical film about the life of Juventino Rosas, titled , was directed by Miguel Zacarías in 1933. Another Mexican film biography using this title was directed in 1950 by Ismael Rodríguez and starred Pedro Infante.

A cover with English lyrics is performed as "The Loveliest Night of the Year" in the 1951 American film The Great Caruso.

 "Sobre las olas" is the main musical theme of the 1980 arcade game Carnival.
 The theme is used in the Atari 2600 video game Pitfall II: Lost Caverns (1984).
 A rendition by the Mexico Festival Orchestra, conducted by Enrique Bátiz, is included in the in-game classical radio station Radio Eterna of the 2021 racing game Forza Horizon 5.

References

External links
 
 Sheet music for "Over the Waves", F. Trifet & Co., 1895.
 

1888 compositions
1888 songs
Mexican music
Songs with music by Juventino Rosas
Waltzes